Li Calzi Airport  was a privately owned, public-use airport located two nautical miles (2.3 mi, 3.7 km) south of the central business district of Bridgeton, a city in Cumberland County, New Jersey, United States.

Facilities and aircraft 
It had one runway designated 12/30 with a turf surface measuring 2,773 by 100 feet (845 x 30 m). For the 12-month period ending April 30, 2007, the airport had 300 general aviation aircraft operations, an average of 25 per month.

References

External links 
 Aerial photo as of 10 March 1991 from USGS The National Map

Bridgeton, New Jersey
Defunct airports in New Jersey
Transportation buildings and structures in Cumberland County, New Jersey